CHS may refer to:

Businesses and organizations

Healthcare bodies
 Canadian Hemophilia Society, a non-profit
 Center for Healthy Sex, a therapy center in Los Angeles, U.S.
 Community Health Systems, an American hospital network

Other businesses and organizations
 CHS Inc., an American agricultural co-operative
 Canadian Hydrographic Service, a government body
 Connecticut Historical Society, an American non-profit

Places by code
 Charleston International Airport, South Carolina, U.S. (by IATA airport code)
 Cheshire, a county of England (by Chapman code in genealogy)

Schools and education

United States
 Canton High School (Massachusetts)
 Calumet High School (Calumet, Michigan)
 Cedar City High School, Utah
 Center for Hellenic Studies, a research institute in Washington, D.C.
 Chalmette High School, Louisiana
 Chattahoochee High School, Georgia
 Chattahoochee High School (Florida)
 Cheshire High School, Connecticut
 Cienega High School, Arizona
 Clements High School, Sugar Land, Texas
 Cleveland High School (Portland, Oregon)
 Clifton High School (New Jersey)
 Charlotte High School (disambiguation), the name of schools in Florida, Michigan, New York, North Carolina, and Texas
 Columbine High School, Colorado
 Conard High School, Connecticut
 Collinsville High School, Illinois
 Conestoga High School, Pennsylvania
 Crater High School, Oregon
 Winston Churchill High School (Potomac, Maryland)
 Custer High School (Custer, South Dakota)

Elsewhere
 Catholic High School, Melaka, Malaysia
 Catholic High School, Petaling Jaya, Malaysia
 Cheadle Hulme School, Greater Manchester, England
 Clarence High School (India), east Bangalore, Kamataka 
Clifton High School (Bristol) Bristol, England 
 Colegio Hebreo Sefaradí, a Jewish private school in Cuajimalpa, Mexico City
 College Historical Society, at Trinity College, Dublin, Ireland
 Congleton High School, Cheshire, England
 Cronulla High School, Sydney, Australia
 Catholic High School, Singapore

Science and technology
 Cannabinoid hyperemesis syndrome, a medical condition
 Chalcone synthase, a plant enzyme
 Circular hollow section, British term for a hollow structural section
 Contact Handling System, software used by the Metropolitan Police, London, U.K.
 Cylinder-head-sector, a method for addressing data on magnetic disks

Other uses
 Confidential human source, an informant
 Core Humanitarian Standard on Quality and Accountability, a code for humanitarian and development actors